Enas Faris Ahmad Al-Jamaeen (born 11 November 2003), also known as Enas Al-Jamaeen, is a Jordanian footballer, who plays as a midfielder for the Turkish Women's Super League club Fomget G.S., and the Jordan women's national team.

Early life
Enas Faris Ahmad Al-Jamaeen was born in Dhiban, Jordan on 11 November 2003.

Club career
Al-Jamaeen played for Amman SC in her country, before she moved to Turkey end December 2021, and joined the Ankara-based club Fomget G.S. to play in the 2021-22 Turkcell Women's Super League.

International career
Al-Jamaeen made her senior debut for Jordan on 7 April 2021 in a 0–1 friendly loss to Lithuania.. She scored her first international goal against India on 19 March 2023 in a friendly match.

International goals
Scores and results list Jordan's goal tally first.

References 

2003 births
Living people
People from Madaba Governorate
Jordanian women's footballers
Women's association football midfielders
Jordan women's international footballers
Jordanian expatriate footballers
Jordanian expatriate sportspeople in Turkey
Expatriate women's footballers in Turkey
Fomget Gençlik ve Spor players
Turkish Women's Football Super League players